The Arthritis Foundation is a nonprofit organization that is dedicated to addressing the needs of people living with arthritis in the United States. There are more than 50 million adults and 300,000 children living with arthritis, the nation's leading cause of disability. The Foundation works to provide information and resources, access to care, advancements in science and community connections.

The Arthritis Foundation also publishes the magazine Arthritis Today. Through local offices nationwide, the Foundation sponsors a variety of year-round events to raise funds and create awareness, from local walks and runs to dinners, galas and other affairs.

The Arthritis Foundation has contributed to arthritis research since its founding in 1948, and has invested over $470 million toward medical research into the disease In addition, the organization advocates for changes to health care policies, legislation and government-funded research to improve the lives of individuals and families affected by arthritis.

The Foundation funds two patient registries, the Arthritis Internet Registry (AIR) and the Childhood Arthritis and Rheumatology Research Alliance (CARRA), to help control symptoms and accelerate the search for a cure by analyzing and correlating biological data.

Access and Advocacy
The Arthritis Foundation holds the annual Advocacy Summit, in which arthritis advocates converge in Washington, D.C., to meet with Capitol Hill lawmakers. Participants tell their stories and put a human face on arthritis pain. They continue to urge elected officials to join the Congressional Arthritis Caucus, chaired by Reps. David McKinley (R-WV) and Anna Eshoo (D-CA). The caucus serves as a bipartisan forum to aid senators and representatives in working together to address arthritis.

Tools used by the Foundation for advocacy include state-by-state arthritis prevalence data, regular issue briefs, e-advocacy opportunities, a health care reform Q&A, and sample letters and tips to raise awareness about arthritis.

Types of arthritis
The Arthritis Foundation offers information and assistance for the more than 100 types of the disease, including conditions like osteoarthritis, rheumatoid arthritis, juvenile arthritis, gout, fibromyalgia and psoriatic arthritis.

Community events and programs
Community events and programs run by the Arthritis Foundation help educate the public about the realities of arthritis, raise funds and awareness, and encourage people with arthritis to manage their joint pain and improve overall health. Nationwide activities include Walk to Cure Arthritis and Jingle Bell Run/Walk. In addition, the Arthritis Foundation hosts dinners, galas and other specialty parties to raise funds for the Foundation's efforts.

Through community programs like Walk With Ease and Put Pain in Its Place, the Arthritis Foundation encourages people with arthritis to get moving and provides tools to help manage their arthritis pain.

History
Organized in 1948 as the Arthritis and Rheumatism Foundation, the organization's name was changed in 1964 to the Arthritis Foundation. The following year, the American Rheumatism Association (ARA) merged with the Foundation. In 1965, an additional professional society, Allied Health Professions, was established within the Foundation; its name was changed to the Arthritis Health Professions Association (AHPA) in 1980. The American Juvenile Arthritis Organization (AJAO) was established in 1981 as a membership group within the Foundation; in 1991, AJAO became a council of the Foundation. In 1986, the ARA became a separate, independent organization and now is known as the American College of Rheumatology (ACR). In 1994, the AHPA became a division of the ACR and changed its name to the Association of Rheumatology Health Professionals.

The Arthritis Foundation is headquartered in Atlanta, Georgia, and has more than 100 local offices nationwide.

Assets
As of 2018 the Arthritis Foundation had total assets of $175,798,470.

Funding details
Funding details as of 2018:

Partnerships 
The Arthritis Foundation receives funding from its corporate partners, including AbbVie, Alpha Omicron Pi, American Orthopaedic Foot and Ankle Society, American Physical Therapy Association, Amgen, Boehringer Ingelheim, Bristol Myers Squibb, Eli Lilly and Company, Genentech, Janssen, Novartis, Organon, Pfizer, Tylenol and UCB.

Ease of Use Commendation 
The Arthritis Foundation's Ease of Use Commendation recognizes products proven to make life easier for people who have arthritis and other physical limitations. The Arthritis Foundation's Ease of Use Commendation identifies products that have been tested and evaluated by experts and people with arthritis. Companies which have had products accredited with the Ease of Use commendation include Fiskars, Melnor and Acorn Stairlifts.

Similar organizations
 Arthritis Australia - Australia
 Versus Arthritis - UK
 Arthritis Consumer Experts - Canada
 Spondylitis Association of America- U.S.A. 
 The Arthritis Society – Canada
 The Swedish Rheumatism Association - Sweden

References

External links
 Arthritis Foundation Official Website

Arthritis organizations
Medical and health foundations in the United States
Organizations based in Atlanta
Organizations established in 1948